The Hurlingham Open is a yearly polo competition that takes place at the Hurlingham Club, Argentina.

External links
119th Hurlingham Open 

Polo competitions in Argentina
Hurlingham, Buenos Aires
1893 establishments in Argentina